Grace C. Bibb (1842–1912) was a feminist and philosopher.  She was part of the push for equality between the sexes, as well as an advocate for women's rights, access to higher education, expansion in employment opportunities, a right to equal pay, and a woman's right to vote. She was appointed Dean at the Normal school despite the fact that women were not at that time allowed to attend the College. In her position at the Normal school, Bibb pushed that women be allowed into the College of Education. She later pushed for women to be allowed into all other University departments.

Career

Bibb was the first female appointed a deanship at Normal School aka College of Education, University of Missouri. She served as head of the Normal School from 1878 to 1883. Under her leadership women were first allowed into Normal College then all other University departments. She married Thomas Sudborough in 1884 and moved to Nebraska.

She was part of the earlier feminist movement and incorporated feminist ideas in her work, including as a frequent contributor to the Western Review and the Journal of Education.

GRACE C BIBB-SUDBOROUGH's ACHIEVEMENTS 
PUBLISHED ARTICLES
The Training to Citizenship, Illinois Teacher, November 1869
In the Vineyard, Illinois Teacher, December 1870
Course of Study of High Schools, Illinois Teacher, 1871    
Women as Teachers, Journal of Education (St. Louis), 1873
The Theatre in Blackfriars, The Western, February 1875
Lady Macbeth, The Western, May 1875
Avenues into which Our Work Leads Us, The Western, December 1875
Art as a Medium of Civilization, American Journal of Education, 1876
The English Novel—Its Art Value, The Western, May 1876
Women as Teachers, American Journal of Education, November 1877
Arnold of Rugby, UM Public Lectures, 1878-79
Normal Departments in State Universities, Journal and Proceedings of NEA, 1880
The Education of the Public with Reference to Normal Schools and Their Work, Education, July 1881
Educational Intelligence, Journal of Education, 1894 
Rousseau, 1895
Children’s Interests, The Northwestern Journal of Education, July 1896
What Children Imitate, The Northwestern Journal of Education, July 1896
What They Say, Journal of Education 1898
LEADERSHIP 
Member Illinois State Teachers Association, 1866
NEA Missouri Vice-President, 1879-80
NEA Officer, 1881-1882
NEA Missouri State Manager, 1876–77, 1882-83
NEA Secretary for Louisville, 1877
NEA Secretary for Philadelphia Department of Normal Schools, 1879
NEA Missouri State Director, 1881-82
President of The Society of Child Study, Library Association of Nebraska, 1896
Officer of Library Committee of the Omaha Women’s Club, 1897
Omaha Women’s Club Leader, 1900
Omaha Women’s Club Leader, Department of History, 1901
CONFERENCE PRESENTATIONS
Monthly Examinations—Do They Have Their Perfect Work?, Illinois State Teachers Association, Decatur, August 1871
Relation of Art to Education, National Education Association Convention, Minneapolis, August 4, 1875 
Women as Teachers, Minneapolis, August 1875
Attacks on Normal Schools, Louisville, Teachers’ National Association, August 1877
Evening Session: What Shall We Read?, Missouri Valley State Teachers Association, 1878
The Best Way of Arousing an Interest in Normal Work, 19th Annual Teachers’ Association Session, Columbia, MO, July 1880
Child Study and the Professional Training of Teachers, Nebraska Teachers’ Association 29th Meeting, December 27, 1894 
Child Study Session, Educational Covention’s Program, Omaha, NE, June 28–30, 1898 
WORK EXPERIENCE
ILLINOIS HIGH SCHOOL* location unknown, High School Teacher
ILLINOIS NORMAL SCHOOL, (1870–71), Assistant Principal
ST. LOUIS CITY SCHOOLS, (1872), High School Teacher
ST. LOUIS NORMAL SCHOOL, (1873–77), Assistant Principal
DEAN UNIVERSITY OF MISSOURI NORMAL COLLEGE , 1878-83
OMAHA NORMAL SCHOOL (1890), Principal 
OMAHA HIGH SCHOOL, Highschool Teacher, 1898-1911 (History, Mathematics, Physiology, Physical Geography-Geology)
ADDRESSES
Olive sw. cor. 12th, St. Louis, MO, 1871
Park Hotel, St. Louis, MO, 1872
1313 Chestnut, St. Louis, MO, 1874-75
2839 Olive, St. Louis, MO, 1887-78

Clubs
 St. Louis Hegelian Circle- translated the work of Rosenkranz and appeared in Journal of Speculative Philosophy. Bibb and her female Colleagues could not join the Society but could attend meetings and contribute articles and translations to the Journal of Speculative Philosophy. Other well known female philosophers attending meetings included Susan Blow, Anna Brackett and Maretta Kies.

Publications
 1873 "Women as Teachers". Journal of Education 2:12:225.  
 1875 "Lady Macbeth: a Study in Character". the Western Review 1:287. 
 1875 "Avenues into which our Work Leads Us". the Western Review 1: 731. 
 1880 "Education of the Public as to Normal School Education ". Education 1: 574. 
 1880 "Normal Departments in State Universities". Address to the National Education Association.

References

External links
 
 
 

1842 births
1912 deaths
Philosophers from Missouri
American feminists
University of Missouri staff